Chathurvedam is a 1977 Indian Malayalam-language film, directed by J. Sasikumar and produced by S. S. R. Kalaivaanan. The film stars Prem Nazir, Adoor Bhasi, Thikkurissy Sukumaran Nair, Sankaradi, Padmapriya. The film has musical score by G. Devarajan.

Cast

Prem Nazir
Adoor Bhasi
Thikkurissy Sukumaran Nair
Sankaradi
Padmapriya
Sreelatha Namboothiri
Alummoodan
Bahadoor
Meena
Paravoor Bharathan
Philomina

Soundtrack
The music was composed by G. Devarajan and the lyrics were written by Sreekumaran Thampi.

References

External links
 

1977 films
1970s Malayalam-language films
Films directed by J. Sasikumar